In mathematics, Vojta's conjecture is a conjecture introduced by  about heights of points on algebraic varieties over number fields. The conjecture was motivated by an analogy between diophantine approximation and Nevanlinna theory (value distribution theory) in complex analysis. It implies many other conjectures in Diophantine approximation, Diophantine equations, arithmetic geometry, and mathematical logic.

Statement of the conjecture
Then there is a constant  and a non-empty Zariski open set , depending on all of the above choices, such that

Examples: 
 Let . Then , so Vojta's conjecture reads  for all . 
 Let  be a variety with trivial canonical bundle, for example, an abelian variety, a K3 surface or a Calabi-Yau variety. Vojta's conjecture predicts that if  is an effective ample normal crossings divisor, then the -integral points on the affine variety  are not Zariski dense.
This last statement for varieties of general type is the Bombieri–Lang conjecture.

Generalizations

There are generalizations in which the non-archimedean local heights  are replaced by truncated local heights, which are local heights in which multiplicities are ignored. These versions of Vojta's conjecture provide natural higher-dimensional analogues of the ABC conjecture.

References

Conjectures
Unsolved problems in number theory